The Paulet Baronetcy, of West Hill Lodge in the County of Southampton, was a title in the Baronetage of the United Kingdom. It was created on 18 March 1836 for the 21-year-old Henry Paulet, in honour of his late father, Vice-Admiral Lord Henry Paulet, younger son of the twelfth Marquess of Winchester. The title became extinct on his death in 1886.

Paulet baronets, of West Hill Lodge (1836)
Sir  Henry Charles Paulet, 1st Baronet (1814–1886)

See also
Marquess of Winchester

References

Extinct baronetcies in the Baronetage of the United Kingdom
Paulet family